Adrian John Flook (born 9 July 1963) is a British Conservative politician, and a former Member of Parliament (MP).

Early life
Flook was educated at King Edward School, Bath and Mansfield College, Oxford where he studied (BA) Modern History. He was a stockbroker from 1985 to 1998, working first for UBS Warburg and then for Société Générale. From 1998 to 2002 he worked as a consultant for Financial Dynamics.

Parliamentary career
At the 1997 general election, he stood unsuccessfully in the safe Labour Party constituency of Pontefract and Castleford.

At the 2001 general election, he was elected as MP for Taunton, taking the traditionally Conservative seat that had been captured by the Liberal Democrat Jackie Ballard at the 1997 election. Flook's victory in Taunton was one of just nine total gains made by the Conservative Party at the 2001 General Election where, under William Hague's leadership, the Party made a net gain of just one seat in the House of Commons. The seat of Taunton was high on the Conservative Party's target list, receiving a visit from Hague himself on the first day of the campaign. Flook served only one term, losing his seat at the 2005 election to the Liberal Democrat Jeremy Browne. While in Parliament he served on the Select committee on Culture, Media and Sport.

After Parliament
Flook worked for the public relations firm M: Communications, where he has performed pro bono work on behalf of the so-called NatWest Three. Currently, he works as a Consultant for C|T|F Partners. He is a national patron of domestic violence charity ManKind Initiative.
He was then elected to Wandsworth Council for the ward of Wandsworth Common in the 2018 local elections.

Personal life
He married Frangelica O'Shea in 2003. Their  daughter, Clementine Alexia, was born in 2005.

References

 Debrett's People of Today

External links
 
 theyworkforyou.com entry
 publicwhip.org.uk entry

Living people
1963 births
Conservative Party (UK) MPs for English constituencies
Politicians from Somerset
UK MPs 2001–2005
British public relations people
British stockbrokers
People educated at King Edward's School, Bath
Alumni of Mansfield College, Oxford